Broadcasting & Cable (or Broadcasting+Cable) is a weekly telecommunications industry trade magazine published by Future US. Previous names included Broadcasting-Telecasting, Broadcasting and Broadcast Advertising, and Broadcasting. B&C, which was published biweekly until January 1941, and weekly thereafter, covers the business of television in the U.S.—programming, advertising, regulation, technology, finance, and news. In addition to the newsweekly, B&C operates a comprehensive website that provides a roadmap for readers in an industry that is in constant flux due to shifts in technology, culture and legislation, and offers a forum for industry debate and criticism.

History 
Broadcasting was founded in Washington, D.C., by Martin Codel, Sol Taishoff, and former National Association of Broadcasters president Harry Shaw, and the first issue was published on October 15, 1931.  Originally, Shaw was publisher, Codel editor, and Taishoff managing editor; when Shaw retired, Codel became publisher and Taishoff took over as editor-in-chief. (Taishoff had succeeded Codel writing the radio column for the Consolidated Press Association, both men using the pseudonym “Robert Mack”; the two met while covering radio in Washington.)  The men operated under the corporate name Broadcasting Publications, Inc.; after Shaw's departure, the company was owned by Codel, Taishoff, and their wives. Codel left the magazine in January 1943, to work in public relations for the Red Cross in the North African theater of the war, but remained on the masthead as publisher until June 1944, at which point Taishoff and his wife bought out the Codels' interest in the magazine.  Taishoff then assumed the post of the publisher in addition to editor.

Broadcasting merged with Broadcast Advertising in 1932, with the Broadcast Reporter in 1933, and with Telecast in 1953.  The title was changed to Broadcasting-Telecasting beginning with the November 26, 1945, issue; Telecasting was dropped from the cover page on October 14, 1957, but remained on the masthead through January 5, 1959.  The title remained Broadcasting thereafter until February 22, 1993, becoming Broadcasting & Cable with the March 1, 1993 issue.

Sol Taishoff won a Peabody Award for his reporting in 1980. Times Mirror bought Broadcasting in 1986 from the Taishoff family. Cahners Publishing bought Broadcasting in 1991. In 2009, Cahners successor Reed Business Information sold TWICE, Broadcasting & Cable and Multichannel News to NewBay Media. Future acquired NewBay Media in 2018. In 2020, Future folded Broadcasting & Cable into its new platform, Next TV.

Hall of Fame
The magazine sponsors an annual dinner at which about a dozen industry professionals are inducted into its Broadcasting & Cable Hall of Fame.

In December 2012, the television court show Judge Judy earned its star, Judy Sheindlin, a spot in the Broadcasting & Cable hall of fame. Sheindlin accepted the honor at the Waldorf Astoria Hotel in New York.

In 2015, the Hall of Fame celebrated its 25th anniversary and to date has honored nearly 400 executives, talent and shows, including Bob Iger, chairman and CEO of The Walt Disney Company; sports broadcaster and former NFL player Frank Gifford; Dr. Phil McGraw, host of Dr. Phil; and Kathie Lee Gifford, co-anchor of the fourth hour of Today.

, only fifteen shows have either been inducted or are scheduled to be inducted:
 20/20
 60 Minutes
 American Idol
 Dateline NBC
 Entertainment Tonight
 Family Feud
 Good Morning America
 Inside the NBA
 Live with Kelly & Michael
 Mad Men
 Monday Night Football
 The Simpsons
 SportsCenter
 Today
 The View

References

External links
 
 Don West Broadcasting & Cable at the University of Maryland Libraries 
Magazine archives

Weekly magazines published in the United States
Magazines established in 1931
Magazines published in New York City
Professional and trade magazines
Television magazines published in the United States
Magazines published in Washington, D.C.
Biweekly magazines published in the United States